Tim Grossklaus (born 22 July 1987) is a German former professional footballer who played as a forward.

Career 
Grossklaus was born in Freiburg, West Germany. He started his career at FC Basel's youth team in 2005 and had a successful second season there in which he scored 21 goals in 29 appearances for FC Basel Under-21s. His goal-scoring form caught the eye of many Austrian and Swiss clubs and he eventually joined Liechtenstein side FC Vaduz in summer 2007. He helped the club secure promotion to the Swiss Super League from the Swiss Challenge League in the 2007–08 season. On 15 January 2009, he moved  to FC Wil on loan along with teammate Diren Akdemir.

References

External links 
 Profile at Swiss Football League Website 

Living people
1987 births
German footballers
Association football forwards
Swiss Super League players
FC Basel players
FC Vaduz players
FC Wil players
German expatriate footballers
German expatriate sportspeople in Switzerland
Expatriate footballers in Switzerland
German expatriate sportspeople in Liechtenstein
Expatriate footballers in Liechtenstein
Sportspeople from Freiburg im Breisgau
Footballers from Baden-Württemberg